Brisbane railway station may refer to these railway stations in Brisbane, Australia:

Central railway station, Brisbane, main suburban station
Roma Street railway station, main station for long distance services
South Brisbane railway station, former interstate terminal until 1986